Thomas Cairns (1896 – 13 October 1917) was an English professional footballer who played in the Football League for Newcastle United as an inside left.

Personal life 
Prior to joining Newcastle United, Cairns worked as a driver. He enlisted as a gunner in the Royal Field Artillery in 1915, during the First World War. Serving in 'Z' 61st Trench Mortar Battery, he saw action at Fromelles and at the Third Battle Of Ypres and rose to the rank of corporal. Cairns was killed east of Arras on 13 October 1917, during the build-up to the offensive on Cambrai. He has no known grave and is commemorated on the Arras Memorial.

Career statistics

References

1896 births
1917 deaths
Association football inside forwards
English footballers
Newcastle City F.C. players
Newcastle United F.C. players
English Football League players
British Army personnel of World War I
Royal Field Artillery soldiers
British military personnel killed in World War I
People from the Metropolitan Borough of Gateshead
Footballers from Tyne and Wear